George Paul Oulu also known as Oulu GPO (died March 5, 2009) was a Kenyan human rights activist and a former Vice Chairman of the Students Organization of Nairobi University(SONU);the representative student body at the University of Nairobi. His 2009 assassination is widely attributed to his work in documenting police killings.

Human rights work
Oulu was credited with an important role in investigative work behind police killings in Kenya, including The Cry of Blood — Report on Extra-Judicial Killings and Disappearances, which was widely publicised by WikiLeaks.

Assassination
Oulu was shot and killed while sitting in rush hour traffic in Nairobi on March 5, 2009, along with lawyer and founder of the Oscar Foundation, Oscar Kamau Kingara. Following the assassination, WikiLeaks called for witness reports and described Kingara and Oulu as "Wikileaks-related senior human rights activists".

See also
Human rights in Kenya

References 

2009 deaths
Kenyan human rights activists
Assassinated activists
Year of birth missing